Backstage Passes and Backstabbing Bastards: Memoirs of a Rock 'N' Roll Survivor is a 1998 autobiography by American songwriter, record producer and musician Al Kooper. The book is a revised version of Kooper's earlier 1977 book Backstage Passes: Rock 'n' Roll Life In The Sixties. The 1998 edition was initially published by Billboard Books, but went out of print until 2008, when it was re-published by the Hal Leonard Corporation with updates to the text.

Synopsis
In the book Kooper talks about his interactions with the music industry, including information about artists such as Bob Dylan. Kooper also discusses his days as a successful songwriter who co-authored the hit "This Diamond Ring"; his membership in The Blues Project; his forming and leaving the band Blood, Sweat, and Tears; his collaborations and friendship with blues guitarist Mike Bloomfield; and, his discovery and early production of Southern rock legends Lynyrd Skynyrd.

Reception
Critical reception to Backstage Passes and Backstabbing Bastards was positive, with the Headpress Guide to the Counter Culture commenting that it was "a genuinely funny read". The book also garnered a positive review from The Morton Report, who commented that it was a "great book" and that "almost every paragraph is designed to make you laugh in a laconic and self-deprecating manner".

References

1998 non-fiction books
Music autobiographies
American non-fiction books